The tiger shark, Galeocerdo cuvier, is a large fish in the family Carcharhinidae.

Tiger shark, Tiger Shark and Tigershark may also refer to:

Arts and entertainment
 Tiger Shark (film), a 1932 pre-code film
 Tigershark (film), a 1987 action film
 TigerShark, a 1997 video game
 TigerSharks, a 1980s animated children's TV series
 Tiger Shark (DC Comics), several fictional characters
 Tiger Shark (Marvel Comics), a fictional character
 , the name of several fictional submarines

Other uses
 Tigershark PWC, a personal watercraft manufacturer
 Kozo Urita, or Tiger Shark, a Japanese professional wrestler 
 NASC TigerShark XP, an unmanned aerial vehicle 
 Northrop F-20 Tigershark, an American fighter aircraft
 Tallahassee Tiger Sharks, an ice hockey team

See also

 Sand tiger shark, Carcharias taurus
Mediterranean sand tiger shark Carcharias taurus europaeus
 Smalltooth sand tiger shark, Odontaspis ferox